Derion Rayshawn Kendrick (born August 24, 2000) is an American football cornerback for the Los Angeles Rams of the National Football League (NFL). He played college football at Clemson and Georgia.

Early years
Kendrick attended South Pointe High School in Rock Hill, South Carolina. He played quarterback and wide receiver in high school. As a senior, he was the South Carolina Gatorade Football Player of the Year after passing for 2,683 yards and 30 touchdowns and rushing for 1,194 yards and 20 touchdowns. Kendrick played in the 2018 U.S. Army All-American Game and was a finalist for the U. S. Army Player of the Year Award. He committed to Clemson University to play college football.

College career
Kendrick started his Clemson career in 2018 as a wide receiver. As a true freshman that season, he played in 15 games, recording 15 receptions for 210 yards. Prior to his sophomore season in 2019, he transitioned into a cornerback on an emergency basis, but after impressing coaches, he moved to the position full-time and earned a starting job. In 15 starts he had 43 tackles, two interceptions and a touchdown.

In February 2021, Kendrick was dismissed from the Clemson University football team. This came after a history of disciplinary problems. In June, he announced he was transferring to  Georgia.

Professional career

Kendrick was drafted by the Los Angeles Rams in the sixth round, 212th overall, of the 2022 NFL Draft. In his rookie season, he appeared in 15 games, of which he started six. He had 43 total tackles (36 solo) and four passes defended.

References

External links
 Los Angeles Rams bio
 Clemson Tigers bio
 Georgia Bulldogs bio

2000 births
American football cornerbacks
American football wide receivers
Clemson Tigers football players
Living people
People from Rock Hill, South Carolina
Players of American football from South Carolina
Georgia Bulldogs football players
Los Angeles Rams players